Biblical infallibility is the belief that what the Bible says regarding matters of faith and Christian practice is wholly useful and true. It is the "belief that the Bible is completely trustworthy as a guide to salvation and the life of faith and will not fail to accomplish its purpose."

Background
Historically, Jewish and Christian interpreters of the Bible have seen it as reliable and trustworthy, but such views do not imply in equating veracity to historicity, scientificity or even facticity. The idea of biblical infallibility gained ground in Protestant churches as a fundamentalist reaction against a general movement towards modernism within mainstream Christian denominations in the 19th and early 20th centuries. 

In the Catholic church, the reaction produced the concept of papal infallibility whereas, in the evangelical churches, the infallibility of the Bible was asserted. "Both movements represent a synthesis of a theological position and an ideological-political stance against the erosion of traditional authorities. Both are antimoderne and literalist."
No matter how little common ground was apparent at the time between Roman Catholicism and the Evangelical Right, these two reformulations of scriptural and papal supremacy represented a defiant assertiveness in reaction against the crisis of religious authority that was engulfing Western religion.

Patristic 
Clement of Rome in his Letter to the Corinthians (AD 90) says:
1Clem 45:1-5:
 You are contentious, brethren, and zealous for the things which lead to salvation. You have studied the Holy Scriptures, which are true, and given by the Holy Spirit. You know that nothing unjust or counterfeit is written in them. You will not find that the righteous have been cast out by holy men. The righteous were persecuted, but it was by the wicked. They were put in prison; but it was by the unholy. They were stoned by law-breakers, they were killed by men who had conceived foul and unrighteous envy. These things they suffered, and gained glory by their endurance.

Denominational positions

Catholicism
The Catholic Church speaks not about infallibility of scripture but about its freedom from error, holding "the doctrine of the inerrancy of Scripture". The Second Vatican Council, citing earlier declarations, stated: "Since everything asserted by the inspired authors or sacred writers must be held to be asserted by the Holy Spirit, it follows that the books of Scripture must be acknowledged as teaching solidly, faithfully and without error that truth which God wanted put into sacred writings for the sake of salvation." It added: "Since God speaks in Sacred Scripture through men in human fashion, the interpreter of Sacred Scripture, in order to see clearly what God wanted to communicate to us, should carefully investigate what meaning the sacred writers really intended, and what God wanted to manifest by means of their words."

Methodism
The Methodist theologian Thomas A. Lambrecht notes that John Wesley, the founder of Methodism,

As such, Lambrecht notes that "orthodox, evangelical, and traditionalist United Methodists believe in the 'infallibility' of Scripture." "Article V—Of the Sufficiency of the Holy Scriptures for Salvation" in the Articles of Religion states that:

Lambrecht, therefore, writes that:

Evangelicalism
While the doctrines of inerrancy and infallibility are cornerstone doctrines for many quarters of the US Evangelicalism, it is not so for many Evangelicals around the world, for whom God only is inerrant and infallible.

Neighboring concepts

Infallibility and inerrancy 

Some theologians and denominations equate "inerrancy" and "infallibility"; others do not. For example, Davis suggests: "The Bible is inerrant if and only if it makes no false or misleading statements on any topic whatsoever. The Bible is infallible if and only if it makes no false or misleading statements on any matter of faith and practice." 
In this sense it is seen as distinct from biblical inerrancy.

There is a widespread confusion among Evangelical and Christian fundamentalist circles that biblical infallibility means that the Bible cannot contain errors while inerrancy implies that the Bible contains no errors. However, the concept of infallibility has no relation to errors, but the impossibility of failure. 

The confusion between the terms is consistent. Old Testament scholar John Walton uses the term inerrancy in the sense that the "Scripture is not to be understood as making scientific affirmations, particularly in the realms of cosmology, anatomy, and physiology"; however, this definition actually refers to infallibility rather than inerrancy. Using non-theological dictionary definitions, Frame (2002) insists that infallibility is a stronger term than inerrancy. Inerrant' means there are no errors; 'infallible' means there can be no errors." Yet he agrees that "modern theologians insist on redefining that word also, so that it actually says less than 'inerrancy. 

Some denominations that teach infallibility hold that the historical or scientific details, which may be irrelevant to matters of faith and Christian practice, may contain errors. This contrasts with the doctrine of biblical inerrancy, which holds that the scientific, geographic, and historic details of the scriptural texts in their original manuscripts are completely true and without error, though the scientific claims of scripture must be interpreted in the light of the phenomenological nature of the biblical narratives. The Chicago Statement on Biblical Inerrancy uses the term in this sense, saying, "Infallibility and inerrancy may be distinguished but not separated." And "We deny that Biblical infallibility and inerrancy are limited to spiritual, religious, or Redemptive themes, exclusive of assertions in the fields of history and science. We further deny that scientific hypotheses about earth history may properly be used to overturn the teaching of Scripture on Creation and the Flood."

See also

 Biblical literalism
 Christian fundamentalism
 Mammotrectus super Bibliam

References

Christian theology of the Bible
Christian terminology
Methodism